Guayrá (initially called Gobernación del Guayrá) was a historical region of the Spanish Empire, located in the Governorate of Paraguay, within the colonial Viceroyalty of Peru. The region is located in present-day Paraguay and Paraná.

There are some conflicting etymologies for the origin of the name, with some claiming it was named after a cacique of the region whose name was Guayrá or Guayracá. Alternatively, the word might come from Guarani "kwa y ra" ("can not pass", "impassable") or even "guay ra" ("river that goes [beyond]").

Geography
The limits of Guayrá were the Iguazu River on the south, the Paraná River on the west, the Tiete (or Añemby) River to the north, and the line of the Treaty of Tordesillas to the east. The Tiete also marked the boundary between the Tupi and Guarani Indians.

History
The town of Ontiveros was founded by Captain Garcia Rodriguez de Vergara on orders from Domingo Martínez de Irala in 1554. It was intended to serve as a connection to Portuguese Colonial Brazil.

Ciudad Real del Guayrá, also referred to as Guayrá and the present day Guaíra, Paraná, was founded by Captain Ruy Diaz Melgarejo in 1556. It is on the left bank of the Paraná at the confluence of the Pipiry-Guazu.

Guayrá was covered with dense forest and many rivers, and by 1600, it had become a place of refuge for the Guarani from the encomenderos of Paraguay and the Bandeirantes or esclavistas of Brazil.

Aleixo Garcia crossed the region in 1522. In 1542, Alvar Nunez Cabeza de Vaca travelled through its southern reaches on his way to Asunción from Santa Catarina Island.

Jesuit Missions of the Guaranis
However, it was destroyed by the bandeirantes from São Paulo in 1631.

See also
Guarani people
Governorate of Paraguay
 — World Heritage Sites
Governorate of the Río de la Plata
Viceroyalty of the Río de la Plata

Colonial Argentina
History of Paraguay
Guaraní
.
Viceroyalty of the Río de la Plata
Geography of Misiones Province
Geography of Paraguay
Geography of Paraná (state)
Geography of Rio Grande do Sul
Regions of Paraguay
16th century in the Viceroyalty of Peru
17th century in the Viceroyalty of Peru
Governorate of the Río de la Plata
 Regions of South America